Sklithro is a village in Thessaly, Greece, not far from Larissa and Volos. It is part of the Melivoia municipal unit within the Agia municipality.

Geography
Sklithro is a small village near the top of one of Mavrovounion mountain peaks. In the past communication with the outside world was cut off by snow, and during Spring the River Rakopotamos caused problems for the local population. As a result of adjusting to these conditions, inhabitants of the area developed a self-reliant and rugged character. 

Later, roads were built, and Sklithro is now in permanent contact with Agia, Larissa and Volos. Despite an altitude of 2500 feet above sea level, fresh fish is always available in the village due to the proximity of the port of Ayiokambos 15 km away. European programs have enabled the creation of a network of paths where tourists can discover the landscape.

Populated places in Larissa (regional unit)